Abendana is a surname. Notable people with the name include:

 Jacob Abendana (1630–1695), hakam of London
 Isaac Abendana (–1699), hakam of the Spanish Portuguese Synagogue in London
 Isaac Sardo Abendana ( – 1709), Dutch Jewish jeweler and diamond merchant

See also 
 Kenneth Abendana Spencer (1929–2005), Jamaican artist

References 

Jewish surnames